The 1995 Round Australia Trial, officially the Mobil 1 Trial was the thirteenth running of the Round Australia Trial. The rally took place between 13 June and 2 July 1995. The event covered 18,500 kilometres around Australia. It was won by Ed Ordynski and Ross Runnalls, driving a Holden Commodore.

Results

References

Rally competitions in Australia
Round Australia Trial